We the Gathered is an American Christian hardcore, classified as a melodic hardcore and a melodic metalcore group, from Johnstown, Pennsylvania. The band started making music in 2010, and their members at the time are Lance, Randy, Kyle, Josh, and Spencer. They released, an extended play, We the Gathered, in 2010. Their first studio album, Believer, was released by Strike First Records, in 2011. The subsequent album, Daydreamers, was an independent release, in 2013.

Background
We the Gathered is a Christian hardcore and Christian metal band from Johnstown, Pennsylvania. Their members are Lance, Randy, Kyle, Josh, and Spencer.

Music history
The band commenced as a musical entity in 2010, with their first release, We the Gathered, an extended play, that was released by independently, on September 13, 2010. Their first studio album, Believer, was released by Strike First Records, on October 25, 2011. The subsequent album, Daydreamers, was released independently, on March 5, 2013.

Members
Current members
 Lance
 Randy
 Kyle
 Josh
 Spencer

Discography
Albums
 Believer (October 25, 2011, Strike First)
 Daydreamer (March 5, 2013, Independent)
EPs
 We the Gathered (September 13, 2010, Independent)

References

External links
Official website

Musical groups from Pennsylvania
2010 establishments in Pennsylvania
Musical groups established in 2010
Facedown Records artists
Strike First Records artists